The 1968–69 season was Newport County's seventh consecutive season in the Football League Fourth Division since relegation at the end of the 1961–62 season and their 41st overall in the Football League. They finished in the re-election places, but were re-elected.

Season review

Results summary

Results by round

Fixtures and results

Fourth Division

FA Cup

League Cup

Welsh Cup

League table

Election

References

 Amber in the Blood: A History of Newport County.

External links
 Newport County 1968-1969 : Results
 Newport County football club match record: 1969
 Welsh Cup 1968/69

1968-69
English football clubs 1968–69 season
1968–69 in Welsh football